Edward Blum may refer to:

Edward Blum (architect) (1867–1944), French-American designer of apartment and office buildings
Edward Blum (litigant), American director of Project on Fair Representation and visiting fellow at American Enterprise Institute
Ed Blum, British filmmaker